The Unquowa School is a private K-8 school that was established in 1917 by a group of parents in Fairfield, Connecticut.

References

Private elementary schools in Connecticut
Private middle schools in Connecticut
Schools in Fairfield County, Connecticut
Buildings and structures in Fairfield, Connecticut
Private K–8 schools in the United States